Olympos (Greek: Όλυμπος) is the name of a Greek dairy products company based in Trikala, Thessalia.

It was founded in 1965 by an agricultural cooperation in Larissa with the support of Agrotiki Bank.

In 2000 the company changed ownership and its industrial base was transferred to Trikala.

As of 2018, it holds the second place of sales on dairy products in the Greek market with exports to 34 countries.

References

Food and drink companies of Greece
Greek brands
Food and drink companies established in 1965
Companies based in Trikala
Dairy products companies of Greece
Greek companies established in 1965